Riedenburg is a town in the district of Kelheim, in Bavaria, Germany. Prunn Castle (de) is located in Riedenburg.

The town is on the Rhine–Main–Danube Canal.

On the evening of 5 June 2019, a Viking ship, initially said to be the Viking Var, damaged the lock of Riedenburg, on the canal. After the impact, the lock could not be properly closed. No one was injured in the accident. The repair was expected to take two to three weeks to complete.  Later reports indicated the vessel involved in that incident was actually the Viking Tir. The site Vessel Tracker stated that this ship returned to Regensburg a few hours later and remained there; its records indicate that the Tir did not continue on to Budapest until 13 June.

References